Kadhal Meipada is a 2011 Indian Tamil language romance film directed by Ravi Acharya. The film stars Vishnu Priyan and Madhumitha, with Thalaivasal Vijay, Kadhal Dhandapani, Ganja Karuppu, Kuyili, Viji Ketti, Kadhal Sukumar, Chaams and Soori playing supporting roles. It was released on 29 April 2011.

Plot
Shiva and Aishwarya are college students and they fall in love with each other. Shiva is from a middle-class family, while Aishwarya is the daughter of the heartless ganglord Natarajan. Natarajan is hell-bent to save his family's prestige so he is against love marriage. Aishwarya who is scared for Shiva's life decides to break up with him but Shiva convinces to believe in their love. When Natarajan learns about their love affair, he makes the police arrest him and they beat him up in the police lockup. Natarajan then blackmails Aishwarya and forces her to forget Shiva. The couple eventually elope. Thereafter, their family accept for the marriage but Shiva and Aishwarya decide to first finish their studies and they will marry.

Cast

Vishnu Priyan as Shiva
Madhumitha as Aishwarya
Thalaivasal Vijay as Shiva's father
Kadhal Dhandapani as Natarajan, Aishwarya's father
Ganja Karuppu as Azhagar, Shiva's uncle
Kuyili as Shiva's mother
Viji Ketti as Kamakshi, Aishwarya's mother
Kadhal Sukumar as Shiva's friend
Chaams as Narayanan, Shiva's friend
Soori as Shiva's friend
Vadivelu David as House owner
Karate Raja as Aadhi, Aishwarya's uncle
Sampath Ram as Police inspector
Sasi as Sasi
Krishnamoorthy as Fraud
Suruli Manohar as House owner
Kumtaz as Professor
Archana Harish as Poongavanam
Julie as Gayathri
Sopna as Sopna, Shiva's sister
Minnal Deepa as Deepa

Production
Ravi Acharya made his directorial debut with Kadhal Meipada under the banner of Dvarakamai Cine Production. The film started production in late 2007. Vishnu Priyan was cast to play the lead role while Madhumitha was chosen to play the heroine. Ganja Karuppu was also cast to play the comedian. Shree fame T. S. Muralidharan and his assistant Shakthi composed the music of the film under the name of Murshak.

Soundtrack

The soundtrack was composed by Murshak. The soundtrack, released in 2009, features 7 tracks.

Reception
Kungumam gave the film a mixed review. Dinamalar called it a "good film".

References

2011 films
2010s Tamil-language films
Indian romance films
2010s romance films
2011 directorial debut films